Ǧ/ǧ (G with caron, Unicode code points U+01E6 and U+01E7) is a letter used in several Latin orthographies.

In the Romany and Skolt Sami languages, it represents the palatalized g .

It has also been used in Czech (and Slovak) orthographies until the middle of the 19th century to represent the

In the romanization of Pashto, Persian, and South Azeri, ǧ is used to represent  (equivalent to غ).

In the Berber Latin alphabet, ǧ is pronounced  as an English J, like in Jimmy.

In Lakota, ǧ represents voiced uvular fricative .

In DIN 31635 Arabic transliteration it represents the letter .

Computing code

See also
Ğ (with breve)

Latin letters with diacritics
Phonetic transcription symbols